The Wombles is a stop motion animated British television series made in 1973–1975. The Wombles are creatures that live underground, collecting and recycling human rubbish.

After the first Wombles book, published in 1968, was featured on the BBC1 children's television programme Jackanory, the BBC commissioned producer FilmFair to create a television series of the books. The series was produced by Graham Clutterbuck and directed by Ivor Wood using stop-motion. The characters were all voiced by actor Bernard Cribbins. Sets and model making were by Barry Leith. Two series of 30 five-minute episodes were produced, with the first series airing in 1973, animated by Ivor Wood, and the second in 1975, animated by Barry Leith.

The original television series was regularly screened for many years. After FilmFair was acquired by the Canadian company Cinar Films in 1996, a new series of episodes was created, with three new Womble characters.

Episodes

References

External links
 

The Wombles
1970s British animated television series
1970s British children's television series
1973 British television series debuts
1975 British television series endings
BBC children's television shows
British children's animated comedy television series
British stop-motion animated television series
British television shows based on children's books
Television series by FilmFair
Television shows set in London
English-language television shows